Actisomide is an antiarrhythmic drug that is made from disopyramide.

Synthesis

References

Antiarrhythmic agents
Diisopropylamino compounds
Lactams